Macrambyx suturalis is a species of beetle in the family Cerambycidae, the only species in the genus Macrambyx.

References

Cerambycini